USS Delaware (SSN-791) is a  attack submarine built for the United States Navy. The contract to build her was awarded to Huntington Ingalls Industries in partnership with the Electric Boat division of General Dynamics in Newport News, Virginia on 22 December 2008. This boat is the eighth and final of the Block III submarines that feature a revised bow, including some technology from  SSGNs. Construction on Delaware began in September 2013. She was christened on 20 October 2018. She was commissioned administratively after the standard commissioning ceremony was cancelled due to public health concerns over the COVID-19 coronavirus pandemic. Delaware was the first ever US ship commissioned while underwater. The official commissioning ceremony occurred 2 April 2022 at the Port of Wilmington, Delaware.

Design
She is propelled by nuclear power, has a single semi-pump jet style propulsor unit and a complement of 15 officers and 117 enlisted crew members.

References

External links 

 

Virginia-class submarines
Nuclear submarines of the United States Navy
Ships built in Groton, Connecticut